André Muniz de Aguiar (born February 17, 1990) is a Brazilian mixed martial artist who competes in the Middleweight  division of the Ultimate Fighting Championship. As of February 27, 2023, he is #13 in the UFC middleweight rankings.

Background 
Born in Montes Claros, Minas Gerais, Muniz was a very active teenager, which made his mother sign him up for Jiu-Jitsu classes to see if he could get calmer and more disciplined. It worked, Muniz fell in love with martial arts, and started practicing Muay Thai too. His first competition happened when he was 15 years old, a white belt championship in Montes Claros. He began practicing MMA at the age of 19, when he asked his teacher at the time to schedule a fight for him.

Muniz attended Faculdades Unidas do Norte de Minas, from where he graduated with bachelor's degree in physical education with honors.

Mixed martial arts career

Early career
Muniz started his career travelling back and forth between his hometown and  Rio de Janeiro, training with the likes of  Thiago Santos and Luis Henrique at Tata Fight Team, and earning extra money on the side as a personal trainer to make ends meet in between fights. Starting off with a decision win over former PRIDE star and WEC middleweight champion Paulo Filho at the Bitetti Combat 19 event on February 6, 2014, Muniz would go on to win 10 out of the next 11 bouts between 2014 and 2018, culminating in being offered a chance on Dana White's Contender Series.

Dana White's Contender Series 
Muniz was invited onto the Brazilian version of DWCS at Dana White's Contender Series Brazil 2 on August 11, 2018. He won a unanimous decision against Bruno Assis, but the win did not win him a UFC contract.

Almost a year later, Muniz returned to DWCS to face undefeated Taylor Johnson at Dana White's Contender Series 23 on August 6, 2019. He finished Johnson via rear-naked choke in the first round, finally winning a UFC contract.

Ultimate Fighting Championship
After two wins in Dana White's Contender Series, Muniz signed with the UFC and made his promotional debut against Antônio Arroyo at UFC Fight Night: Błachowicz vs. Jacaré on November 16, 2019. He won the fight via unanimous decision.

Muniz made his sophomore appearance against Bartosz Fabiński at UFC Fight Night: Overeem vs. Sakai on September 5, 2020. He won the fight via first-round armbar.

Muniz was scheduled to face Andrew Sanchez at UFC 257 on January 23, 2021. However, Muniz withdrew from the bout and was replaced by Makhmud Muradov.

Muniz faced multiple-time Jiu-Jitsu World Champion Ronaldo Souza at UFC 262 on May 15, 2021. He won the fight via technical submission in the first round after breaking Souza's arm in an armbar, becoming the first person to submit Souza in the process. The feat was widely recognized and named as the Submission of the Year by the mixed martial arts media and also the UFC itself.

Muniz was scheduled to face Dricus Du Plessis on December 11, 2021, at UFC 269. However, Du Plessis was removed from the event due to injury and he was replaced by Eryk Anders. He won the fight via an armbar submission in the first round.

Muniz was scheduled to face Uriah Hall on April 16, 2022, at UFC Fight Night 206 However, Hall withdrew due to undisclosed reasons, and the bout was cancelled. The bout with Hall was rescheduled for UFC 276 on July 2. He won the bout via unanimous decision.

Muniz faced Brendan Allen on February 25, 2023, at UFC Fight Night 220. He lost the fight via a rear-naked choke submission in round three.

Personal life
Muniz is the father of two daughters. In a December 2021 interview with Sherdog, Muniz said that he used the bonus money that he won for his performance against Bartosz Fabinski at UFC Fight Night: Overeem vs. Sakai to purchase a plot of land where he plans to build a home for his family.

Championships and accomplishments
Ultimate Fighting Championship
Performance of the Night (one time) vs. Bartosz Fabinski
Submission of the Year 
Bitetti Combat
Bitetti Combat Middleweight Championship (one time) 
One successful title defense
MMAjunkie.com
2021 May Submission of the Month 
2021 Submission of the Year 
2021 Under-the-Radar Fighter of the Year
MMA Fighting
2021 Submission of the Year 
Sherdog
2021 Submission of the Year 
LowKickMMA
2021 Submission of the Year (tied with Brandon Moreno),

Mixed martial arts record

|-
|Loss
|align=center|23–5
|Brendan Allen
|Submission (rear-naked choke)
|UFC Fight Night: Muniz vs. Allen
|
|align=center|3
|align=center|4:25
|Las Vegas, Nevada, United States
|
|-
|Win
|align=center|23–4
|Uriah Hall
|Decision (unanimous)
|UFC 276
| 
|align=center|3
|align=center|5:00
|Las Vegas, Nevada, United States
|
|-
|Win
|align=center|22–4
|Eryk Anders
|Submission (armbar)
|UFC 269
|
|align=center|1
|align=center|3:13
|Las Vegas, Nevada, United States
|
|-
|Win 
|align=center|21–4
|Ronaldo Souza
|Technical Submission (armbar)
|UFC 262
|
|align=center|1
|align=center|3:59
|Houston, Texas, United States
|
|-
| Win
| align=center|20–4
| Bartosz Fabiński
|Submission (armbar)
|UFC Fight Night: Overeem vs. Sakai
|
|align=center|1
|align=center|2:42
|Las Vegas, Nevada, United States
|
|-
| Win
| align=center|19–4
|Antônio Arroyo
|Decision (unanimous)
|UFC Fight Night: Błachowicz vs. Jacaré
|
|align=center|3
|align=center|5:00
|São Paulo, Brazil
|
|-
| Win
| align=center|18–4
| Taylor Johnson
| Submission (rear-naked choke)
| Dana White's Contender Series 23
| 
| align=center| 1
| align=center| 1:46
| Las Vegas, Nevada, United States
|
|-
| Win
| align=center|17–4
| Bruno Assis
|Decision (unanimous)
|Dana White's Contender Series Brazil 2
|
|align=center|3
|align=center|5:00
|Las Vegas, Nevada, United States
|
|-
| Win
| align=center|16–4
| Willyanedson Paiva
|Submission (armbar)
|Watch Out Combat Show 49
|
|align=center|1
|align=center|0:38
|Rio de Janeiro, Brazil
|
|-
| Win
| align=center|15–4
| João Paulo dos Santos
| TKO (punches)
| Watch Out Combat Show 48
| 
| align=center| 1
| align=center| 1:18
| Rio de Janeiro, Brazil
|
|-
| Loss
| align=center| 14–4
| Azamat Murzakanov
| KO (punch)
|United Caucasian FC 1
|
|align=center|1
|align=center|0:50
|Nalchik, Russia
| 
|-
| Win
| align=center| 14–3
| Welington Lima Rafael
| Submission (rear-naked choke)
| War of Champions 6
|
|align=Center|1
|align=center|1:30
|Montes Claros, Brazil
| 
|-
| Win
| align=center| 13–3
| Carlos Eduardo Tavares Silva
| Submission (guillotine choke)
| X-Fight MMA 12
| 
| align=center| 1
| align=center| 0:45
| Gavião Peixoto, Brazil
| 
|-
| Win
| align=center| 12–3
| Flávio Rodrigo Magon
| Submission (triangle choke)
| X-Fight MMA 11
| 
| align=center| 1
| align=center| 2:15
| Araraquara, Brazil
| 
|-
| Win
| align=center| 11–3
| José Aparecido Santos Gomes
| Submission (arm-triangle choke)
| Coliseu Extreme Fight 12
| 
| align=center| 2
| align=center| 4:36
| Arapiraca, Brazil
| 
|-
| Win
| align=center| 10–3
| Rafael Correia
| Submission (brabo choke)
| Face To Face 10
| 
| align=center| 1
| align=center| N/A
| Itaboraí, Brazil
|
|-
| Win
| align=center| 9–3
| João Paulo dos Santos
|Submission (arm-triangle choke)
| Watch Out Combat Show 40
| 
| align=center| 1
| align=center| 2:40
| Rio de Janeiro, Brazil
|
|-
| Win
| align=center|8–3
| Marcelo Barbosa Ramos
|Submission (guillotine choke)
| Watch Out Combat Show 34
| 
| align=center|1
| align=center|N/A
| Montes Claros, Brazil
|
|-
| Win
| align=center|7–3
| Paulo Filho
| Decision (unanimous)
| Bitetti Combat 19
| 
| align=center| 3
| align=center| 5:00
| Manaus, Brazil
|
|-
| Loss
| align=center|6–3
| Júlio César dos Santos
|TKO (punches)
|Watch Out Combat Show 30
|
|align=center|2
|align=center|1:05
|Montes Claros, Brazil
|
|-
| Win
| align=center|6–2
| Tiago Mônaco
| Submission (brabo choke)
| Bitetti Combat 16
| 
| align=center| 1
| align=center| 2:48
| Rio de Janeiro, Brazil
|
|-
| Win
| align=center| 5–2
| Daniel Oliveira
| KO (punch)
|Watch Out Combat Show 24
|
|align=center|1
|align=center|2:55
|Montes Claros, Brazil
| 
|-
| Win
| align=center| 4–2
| Rodrigo Carlos
| Submission (triangle choke)
| Watch Out Combat Show 22
|
|align=Center|2
|align=center|0:00
|Rio de Janeiro, Brazil
| 
|-
| Loss
| align=center| 3–2
| Douglas Moura
| TKO (punches)
| Jungle Fight 39
| 
| align=center| 1
| align=center| 2:51
| Rio de Janeiro, Brazil
| 
|-
| Win
| align=center| 3–1
| Wagner Silva Gomes
| TKO (punches)
| Fight Brazil Combat
| 
| align=center| 2
| align=center| 1:15
| Montes Claros, Brazil
| 
|-
| Loss
| align=center| 2–1
| Júlio César dos Santos
| TKO (doctor stoppage)
| Bitetti Combat 9 
| 
| align=center| 1
| align=center| 5:00
| Rio de Janeiro, Brazil
| 
|-
| Win
| align=center| 2–0
| Paulo Victor Franco
| TKO (punches)
| Fight Brazil Combat
| 
| align=center| 3
| align=center| 0:00
| Montes Claros, Brazil
|
|-
| Win
| align=center| 1–0
| Ary Santos
|Submission (triangle choke)
| Fight Brazil Combat 11
| 
| align=center| 1
| align=center| 0:00
| Montes Claros, Brazil
|

See also 
 List of current UFC fighters
 List of male mixed martial artists

References

External links
  
 

1990 births
Living people
Brazilian male mixed martial artists
Middleweight mixed martial artists
Mixed martial artists utilizing Muay Thai
Mixed martial artists utilizing Brazilian jiu-jitsu
People from Montes Claros
Ultimate Fighting Championship male fighters
Brazilian practitioners of Brazilian jiu-jitsu
People awarded a black belt in Brazilian jiu-jitsu
Brazilian Muay Thai practitioners
Sportspeople from Minas Gerais